Robert Alexander Holt Methuen, 7th Baron Methuen (22 July 1931 – 9 July 2014), was a British Liberal Democrat peer. He was one of the ninety hereditary peers elected to remain in the House of Lords after the House of Lords Act 1999.

Biography 
Methuen was the third and youngest son of Anthony Methuen, 5th Baron Methuen, by his wife Grace Durning Holt, daughter of Sir Richard Durning Holt, Bt. He was educated at Shrewsbury School before going up to Trinity College, Cambridge, where he graduated in 1957 with a Bachelor of Arts (BA) degree in Engineering.

Methuen worked as a design engineer for Westinghouse Brake and Signal Company from 1957 to 1967, and then as a computer systems engineer for IBM UK Ltd from 1968 to 1975 and for Rolls-Royce Holdings plc from 1975 to 1994. In 1994, he succeeded his elder brother to the title. In the House of Lords, he served on the Science and Technology Select Committee and other committees. He also voted to block the Marriage (Same Sex Couples) Act 2013.

Lord Methuen married firstly Mary Catherine Jane Hooper in 1958; they divorced in 1993. He married secondly Margrit Andrea Hadwiger one year later. He has two daughters by his first wife: Charlotte Methuen (born 1964) and Henrietta Methuen-Jones (born 1965). Henrietta is married to Robert Jones (who took the surname Methuen-Jones) and has three children: Teresa Methuen-Jones (born 1990), Keziah Methuen-Jones (born 1992) and Miriam Methuen-Jones (born 1997).

He died after a short illness on 9 July 2014. He was succeeded in the title by his first cousin once removed, James Methuen-Campbell (born 1952).

Ancestry

Arms

See also
Baron Methuen

References

External links
 www.burkespeerage.com

1931 births
2014 deaths
English people of Scottish descent
People educated at Shrewsbury School
Alumni of Trinity College, Cambridge
Computer systems engineers
Liberal Democrats (UK) hereditary peers
Holt family
Robert
Robert
Younger sons of barons

Hereditary peers elected under the House of Lords Act 1999